Wróbel (meaning "sparrow") is a surname of Polish-language origin. The Russified form is Vrubel. It may also be transcribed as Wrubel.

It may refer to:
 Adolf Wróbel (1930-2014), Polish ice hockey player
 Agata Wróbel (born 1981), Polish weightlifter
 Alfred Wróbel (1927-1993), Polish ice hockey player
 Andrzej Wróbel, paralympic athlete from Poland
 Antoni Wróbel (1923-1988), Polish ice hockey player
 Brian Wrobel (born 1982), American footballer
 David Wrobel (born 1991), German athlete
 Marian Wróbel (1907-1960), Polish chess player
 Michał Wróbel (born 1980), Polish professional football player 
 Marzena Wróbel (born 1963), Polish politician
 Paweł Wróbel (born 1984),  Polish organist
 Piotr Wróbel (born 1953), Polish-Canadian historian
 Tomasz Wróbel (born 1982), Polish footballer

See also
 
Tilmann Wröbel
Wrabel (disambiguation) 
 

Polish-language surnames
Surnames from nicknames